The Truth About Jane and Sam (Chinese: 真心話; Simplified Chinese: 真心话) is a 1999 Hong Kong film co-produced by Hong Kong's Film Unlimited and Singapore's Raintree Pictures.  Directed by Hong Kong director Derek Yee, the movie stars Singapore actress Fann Wong and Taiwanese male singer Peter Ho.

Plot
The main character, Sam, decided to work in Hong Kong after graduating from school in Singapore, as a way to gain a wider exposure in life It was in Hong Kong when he encountered Jane at a movie theater, by chance. Following the encounter, Sam's fascination for Jane led him to discover a lifestyle that is, until now, unknown to him.

Cast

Box office 
 The film grossed SGD$78,261 in Singapore on the sneak preview weekend, making it the top film of the weekend, a rarity for a Hong Kong film in Singapore.  (Hong Kong films have suffered declining cinema attendance rates since the mid-90s.)  The media widely attributed it to the presence of Fann Wong, a leading Singaporean actress, in the lead role.
 At the end of its five-week run in Singapore, it had grossed SGD$1,057,318 - making it the top Hong Kong film of the year in Singapore.
 In Hong Kong, the film grossed over HKD$5 million.

See also
 List of Hong Kong films

Nominations 
 19th Hong Kong Film Awards Best New Performer Award (Fann Wong)

External links 
 Official Website (Archived)

1999 films
Hong Kong romantic comedy-drama films
Films directed by Derek Yee